Nigeria competed in the 2003 All-Africa Games held at the National Stadium in the city of Abuja. It was the eighth time that the country had taken part in the games and expectations were high for the competitors as they were playing on home soil. 2003 was the second time that Nigeria hosted the games, as the 1973 All-Africa Games had been held in Lagos thirty years before. The country did extremely well and achieved a commanding first place in the medal table. The team left with a total of 240 medals, of which 85 were gold medals and 90 silver, a tally that remained unmatched until 2019.

Competitors
Nigeria fielded a team of 303 athletes at the games, far more than any other nation. Of these, 164 were men and 139 women. Mary Onyali-Omagbemi, whose medal tally before the games included gold at the 1994 Commonwealth Games and multiple honours at previous Africa Games, added to her total in the 100 and 200 metres, as well as participating in the 4×100 m relay team that broke the game record with a time of 43.04. Within the team games, there were also individual achievements. Godwin Unegbe achieved the highest number of points in the basketball tournament. In baseball, Jimmy Kolawale led the field in runs and was named best hitter of the games. In chess, Odion Aikhoje and Bunmi Olape both performed well, achieving medals at the second and third boards respectively.

Medal summary
Nigeria won 240 medals in total, substantially more than in previous years and more than the total in the previous two competitions combined. This was the highest number of medals won in the competition until 2019, when the record was beaten by Egypt.

Medal table

List of Medalists

Gold Medal

Silver Medal

Bronze Medal

See also
Amos Adamu

References

2003 in Nigerian sport
2003